Kur Cheshmeh (also Romanized as Kūr Cheshmeh and Kūr Chashmeh) is a village in Afshariyeh Rural District, Khorramdasht District, Takestan County, Qazvin Province, Iran. At the 2006 census, its population was 361, in 81 families.

References 

Populated places in Takestan County